AMSC may refer to:

Army Management Staff College, a school at Fort Leavenworth
Army Medical Service Corps (United States)
American Mobile Satellite Corporation
American Superconductor, an energy technologies company based in Devens, Massachusetts